United States v. Miller or Miller v. United States may refer to:

 United States v. Miller, a 1939 landmark decision of the U.S. Supreme Court that involved a Second Amendment challenge to the National Firearms Act of 1934
 Miller v. United States, a 1958 U.S. Supreme Court case that dealt with Luke Miller and the subject of unlawful entry
 Miller v. California, a 1973 U.S. Supreme Court case that dealt with obscenity and was referred to as Miller v. United States
 United States v. Miller (1976), a 1976 U.S. Supreme Court case that dealt with Fourth Amendment rights
 United States v. Miller, a 2022 case regarding whether defendants in the 2021 U.S. Capitol attack can be charged with obstructing an official proceeding, currently pending in the Court of Appeals for the District of Columbia Circuit